The Lady of Baza (la Dama de Baza) is a famous example of Iberian sculpture by the Bastetani. It is a limestone female figure with traces of painted detail in a stuccoed surface that was found on July 22, 1971, by Francisco José Presedo Velo, at Baza, in the Altiplano de Granada, the high tableland in the northeast of the province of Granada. The town of Baza was the site of the Ibero-Roman city of Basti and, in one of its two necropoleis, the Cerro del Santuario, the Lady of Baza was recovered. She is seated in an armchair, and an open space on the side is thought to have contained ashes from a cremation.

The sculpture's name links it in the popular imagination to its more famous cousin, the Lady of Elche. After conservation, the sculpture, which dates to the fourth century BCE, joined the enigmatic Lady of Elche deposited in the National Archaeological Museum of Spain in Madrid. The chimera Bicha of Balazote and the standing Gran Dama Oferente, also called Dama del Cerro de los Santos, are exhibited in the same room of the museum.

References

External links
Illustration of the Lady of Baza
Article at Enciclopedia Libre

4th-century BC sculptures
Province of Granada
Iberian art
Collection of the National Archaeological Museum, Madrid
Sculptures of women
Sculptures in Madrid
Phoenician sculpture